The Kiri Dam is in Shelleng local government area of Adamawa State in the north east of Nigeria, damming the Gongola River. 
It is a 1.2 km long, 20 m high zoned embankment with an internal clay blanket. The dam was mainly completed in 1982.
The reservoir has a capacity of 615 million m³.

Savannah Sugar Company

The dam was built to provide irrigation for the Savannah Sugar Company (SSC), a large-scale sugar cane plantation and processing company set up as a joint venture between the Nigerian Federal Government and the Commonwealth Development Corporation (CDC), London. The CDC was managing agent for the project, and the construction contract was awarded to NECCO, a company largely owned by the government.

The Savannah Sugar Company was acquired by Dangote Industries in 2002. In 2009 the company owned 32,000 hectares of land near the dam or which 6,330 were in use and employed about 5,000 people.
The company was producing about 50,000 tons of sugar annually, supplying the Nigerian market which consumes 1.1 million tons each year.
Over 1,000 hectares of irrigated rice and other crops were being grown using the company's canals.

Impact

29,000 hectares of land were expropriated without compensation, eventually displacing 20,000 people. Resettlement assistance was inadequate.
The dam has affected the lower reaches of the Gongola River. Flood peaks dropped from 1,420 m³/second to 1,256 m³/second, while flows in dryer seasons increased from 5.7 m³/second to 21 m³/second. 
The river downstream from the dam has narrowed and become less winding, with fewer separate channels.

Future

An assessment of the dam in 2004 rated its condition "good".
In October 2008 the United States Trade and Development Agency issued a request for proposals on constructing a 35 MW hydro-electric power plant at the dam.

References

Dams in Nigeria
Sokoto State
Dams completed in 1982
1982 establishments in Nigeria
20th-century architecture in Nigeria